James Rivera (born April 15, 1960) is an American singer, best known as the frontman for the heavy metal band Helstar. He was also the singer for Seven Witches between 2002 and 2005.

Biography
Rivera got his start singing with power/speed metal act Helstar, a band established in the early 1980s in Houston, Texas. Rivera and guitarist Larry Barragan are the only remaining original members of the band after numerous lineup changes.  In addition to Helstar, Rivera has sung with several other metal bands (most notably Destiny's End and Vicious Rumors) during his music career and belonged to several tribute bands.

Rivera, along with Helstar's other founding member Larry Barragan, rebuilt the original band with guitar player Rob Trevino, bass player Jerry Abarca and drummer Russ De Leon (now substituted by Michael Lewis).
In 2007 the band released Sins Of The Past, a re-recorded best-of including the most famous Helstar songs. In 2008, came a new brand full-length studio album called King Of Hell. They've released a number of albums since then, most recently in 2016 with Vampiro.

Over the years Rivera and Helstar have been active with their live shows across the United States as well as touring in Europe. Helstar hits great stages like the ones of the Keep It True Festival and Headbangers Open Air, both in Germany, and finally the cult Heavy Metal festival in Italy called Play It Loud.

In January 2017, it was announced that Rivera was to join UK-based power metal band Shadowkeep and would record vocals for their fourth album.

References

External links 

 Helstar website

1960 births
Living people
American heavy metal singers
Seven Witches members
People from Houston